Parmich (also Romanized as Parmīch; also known as Parmenj and Pīr Mench) is a village in Barakuh Rural District, Jolgeh-e Mazhan District, Khusf County, South Khorasan Province, Iran. At the 2006 census, its population was 17, in 7 families.

References 

Populated places in Khusf County